Members of the fifth National Assembly were elected on 28 July 2013. The Cambodian People's Party (CPP) won 68 seats, while the remaining 55 seats were won by the Cambodia National Rescue Party (CNRP). It is notable for being the first two-party Assembly.

Composition

2013–2017

2017–2018

List of members
 Cambodian People's Party
 Cambodia National Rescue Party
Note: List only includes elected members. 
 
Source: National Election Committee

Lists of political office-holders in Cambodia